Diré Cercle  is an administrative subdivision of the Tombouctou Region of Mali. The administrative center (chef-lieu) is the town of Diré.

The cercle is divided into 13 communes:

Arham
Binga
Bourem Sidi Amar
Dangha
Diré
Garbakoïra
Haïbongo
Kirchamba
Kondi
Sareyamou
Tienkour
Tindirma
Tinguereguif

References

Cercles of Mali
Tombouctou Region